Lawless Plainsmen is a 1942 American Western film directed by William Berke and written by Luci Ward. The film stars Charles Starrett, Russell Hayden, Cliff Edwards, Luana Walters, Ray Bennett and Gwen Kenyon. The film was released on March 17, 1942, by Columbia Pictures.

The copyright to the film Lawless Plainsmen was renewed in 1970.

Plot

Cast          
Charles Starrett as Steve Rideen
Russell Hayden as 'Lucky' Bannon
Cliff Edwards as Harmony Stubbs 
Luana Walters as Baltimore Bonnie Dixon
Ray Bennett as Seth McBride
Gwen Kenyon as Madge Mason
Frank LaRue as Bill Mason
Stanley Brown as Tascosa
Nick Thompson as Ochella
Eddie Laughton as Murph

References

External links
 

1942 films
1940s English-language films
American Western (genre) films
1942 Western (genre) films
Columbia Pictures films
Films directed by William A. Berke
American black-and-white films
1940s American films